The 2021 Summit League softball tournament took place from May 12-15, 2022. The top six regular-season finishers of the league's seven teams met in the double-elimination tournament at Tharaldson Park on the campus of North Dakota State University in Fargo, North Dakota.
North Dakota State were the defending champions, since the 2020 season was cancelled midway through due to the COVID-19 pandemic. South Dakota State won the tournament after beating Omaha in the final game. This was the Jacks' first Summit League title, and earned the league's automatic berth to the 2021 NCAA Division I softball tournament.

Format and Seeding
The top six teams from the regular season were seeded one through six based on conference record during the league regular season. The tournament played out as a modified double-elimination tournament, with the bottom four seeds playing each other in the single-elimination first round and the rest of the tournament as a double-elimination.

Schedule

All-Tournament Team
The following players were named to the All-Tournament Team:

References

Summit League softball seasons